The Municipality of Komen is a municipality in the Littoral region of Slovenia, near the Italian border. The seat of the municipality is the town of Komen. The municipality was established on 6 November 1994, when the former Municipality of Sežana was dissolved into four smaller municipalities (Divača, Hrpelje-Kozina, Komen, and Sežana).

Settlements
In addition to the municipal seat of Komen, the municipality also includes the following settlements:

 Brestovica pri Komnu
 Brje pri Komnu
 Čehovini
 Čipnje
 Coljava
 Divči
 Dolanci
 Gabrovica pri Komnu
 Gorjansko
 Hruševica
 Ivanji Grad
 Klanec pri Komnu
 Kobdilj
 Kobjeglava
 Koboli
 Kodreti
 Lisjaki
 Lukovec
 Mali Dol
 Nadrožica
 Preserje pri Komnu
 Rubije
 Šibelji
 Škofi
 Škrbina
 Štanjel
 Sveto
 Tomačevica
 Trebižani
 Tupelče
 Vale
 Večkoti
 Volčji Grad
 Zagrajec

Notable people
Notable people that were born or lived in the municipality of Komen include:
Max Fabiani, architect
Franco Giraldi, Italian film director
Anton Mahnič, theologian, activist, bishop of Krk
Marjan Rožanc, writer and essayist 
Majda Širca, journalist and politician

References

External links 

 Municipality of Komen on Geopedia
 Municipal website

 
Komen
1994 establishments in Slovenia